Pu opera, also known as Puzhou clapper opera, is a variety of Chinese opera from southern Shanxi, China. It is closely related to qinqiang.

It is a very old art form, and makes use of very wide linear intervals.

External links

Video
Puju video

Chinese opera
Culture in Shanxi